Francina International Modeling Agency was established in Barcelona in 1983 by the model Francina Díaz Mestre.

History 
In 1982, Mestre opened the Francina New Modeling School, the first of its kind in Spain.  She saw the progress of her school's students and decided to help launch them onto the catwalks and the market by creating her own talent agency, the Francina International Modeling Agency.

The school and agency's first major success came in the early 1990s with Judit Mascó, who became the first Spanish model to be featured on the cover of the Sports Illustrated Swimsuit Issue.  Mestre also represents international models such as Fernanda Tavares, Jeisa Chiminazzo, Tiiu Kuik, and Cintia Dicker.

In 1998, Mestre created the Options by Francina Models Agency in order to discover new talents in the fashion world.

In 2004, she decided to close the School, and fully devote her efforts to the Francina International Modeling Agency and the Options by Francina Models Agency.

See also
 List of modeling agencies

References

External links 
The official Francina International Modeling Agency website
Francina International Modeling Agency Timeline

Modeling agencies
Companies based in Barcelona
1983 establishments in Spain